"Drive My Car" is a song by the English rock band the Beatles, written primarily by Paul McCartney, with lyrical contributions from John Lennon. It was first released on the band's 1965 album Rubber Soul as the opening track. The song later appeared in North America on the Yesterday and Today collection, again to open the record, as the track had been dropped from the American version of Rubber Soul.

Lyrics
A woman tells the song's male narrator that she is going to be a famous movie star, and she offers him the opportunity to be her chauffeur, adding: "and maybe I'll love you". When he objects that his "prospects [are] good", she retorts, "Working for peanuts is all very fine/But I can show you a better time." When he agrees to her proposal, she admits, "I got no car and it's breakin' my heart/But I've found a driver and that's a start." According to McCartney, "'Drive my car' was an old blues euphemism for sex". This expression was more common in the pre-automatic shift era of automobiles.

Composition
When McCartney arrived at Lennon's Weybridge home for a writing session, he had the tune in his head, but "the lyrics were disastrous, and I knew it." The chorus began, "You can buy me diamond rings", a cliché they had used twice before, in "Can't Buy Me Love" and "I Feel Fine" (as well as in the discarded "If You've Got Trouble"). Lennon dismissed the lyrics as "crap" and "too soft". They decided to rewrite the lyrics and after some difficulty – McCartney said it was "one of the stickiest" writing sessions – they settled on the "drive my car" theme (which Bob Spitz credits to Lennon) and the rest of the lyrics flowed easily from that.

It has been suggested that the song also refers to the relationship between Cilla Black and her then boyfriend Bobby Willis (whom she later married). Black was both a friend of the Beatles and a protégée of Brian Epstein. As the TV mini-series Cilla revealed, Willis was also offered a recording contract by Epstein, but Black objected, saying that she was the "star" and Willis was to be the road manager who would "drive my car".

Recording
"Drive My Car" was recorded on 13 October 1965 during the Beatles' first recording session to extend past midnight. McCartney worked closely with George Harrison on the basic rhythm track, the pair playing, in author Ian MacDonald's description, "similar riffing lines on bass and low guitar", respectively, as per Harrison's suggestion. Harrison had been listening to Otis Redding's "Respect" at the time and, as a result of this influence, "Drive My Car" contains more bottom end than previous Beatles recordings, mimicking the bass-heavy sound captured in Redding's Memphis studio; as Ian MacDonald points out, the bassline appears to be directly derived from the bassline of Redding's version of "Respect".  Author Robert Rodriguez describes the track as an "overt R&B workout" and a rare example of the Beatles demonstrating their admiration of Stax and Motown artists on the mostly folk rock-oriented Rubber Soul.

McCartney sang the main vocal part, giving it an energetic push that journalist Richie Unterberger calls "a commanding... hard rock vocal". The vocal rides above a simple two-chord funk riff in the verse, and a much more complex chorus containing piano-driven jazz-style key modulations. McCartney overdubbed both the piano part and the slide guitar solo. The song opens with a bluesy riff played on two electric guitars, before the bass enters. This opening section was also overdubbed onto the basic track. According to musicologist Walter Everett, it provides an ametrical and "off-balance" introduction, "with its blue notes presaging what is to come".

Personnel
According to Walter Everett, except where noted:
 Paul McCartney – lead vocal, bass guitar, piano, slide guitar
 John Lennon – lead vocal, tambourine
 George Harrison – harmony vocal, lead guitar
 Ringo Starr – drums, cowbell

References

Sources

External links

1965 songs
The Beatles songs
Songs written by Lennon–McCartney
Song recordings produced by George Martin
Songs published by Northern Songs
Songs about cars